Hey Ricky is the title of the tenth album release by Melissa Manchester. It was issued on Arista Records in April 1982.

During the interim between the release of Hey Ricky and that of the precedent For the Working Girl in September 1980 Manchester had attempted to extricate herself from her recording contract, filing suit in May 1981 for contractual release from Arista. However it was announced that October that the singer and label had reached terms and the track "Race to the End" - a vocal version of the Chariots of Fire theme - was recorded for single release. The producer was Arif Mardin who had previously collaborated with Manchester in 1979 on "Theme from Ice Castles".

Mardin proceeded to collaborate with Manchester on the tracks which would comprise the album Hey Ricky released in April 1982. The lead single "You Should Hear How She Talks About You," originally recorded by Charlie Dore ("Pilot of the Airwaves"), radically reinvented Manchester as a synthpop dance artist and was heavily promoted by the singer who displayed a new image complementing the track. "You Should Hear How She Talks About You" accrued gradual interest entering the Top 40 of the "Billboard" Hot 100 in July 1982 proceeding to the Top Ten that August with a career best peak for Manchester at #5. The single's popularity was reflected in that of its parent album which Billboard ranked with a #19 peak.

The other cuts on Hey Ricky included the 1981 "Race to the End" single, a duet with David Gates: "Wish We Were Heroes"; "Your Place or Mine" from the soundtrack of the feature film A Little Sex, and a new version of "Come in From the Rain" introduced by Manchester on her 1976 Better Days and Happy Endings album: the last-named song had been co-written with Manchester's most constant lyricist of the 1970s Carole Bayer-Sager who was also represented on Hey Ricky with a new (and final) songwriting collaboration with Manchester entitled ""Looking for the Perfect Ahh" (co-written by Robbie Buchanan). The title cut "Hey Ricky" was written by Manchester with Bernie Taupin the lyricist for Elton John in the first phase of the latter's recording career: "Hey Ricky" was the second (and final) Manchester/ Taupin songwriting collaboration, the pair - after meeting via having the same manager - having collaborated on the title cut of Manchester's 1980 album release For the Working Girl. Issued as the follow-up single to "You Should Hear How She Talks About You", "Hey Ricky" would fail to chart.

After a 1983 Greatest Hits album release Manchester would release only one more album on Arista, then part company with the label, retaining the dance artist focus of her "You Should Hear How She Talks About You" hit for her one album with MCA.

Track listing
 "You Should Hear How She Talks About You" (Dean Pitchford, Tom Snow) - 4:18
 "Slowly" (Ken Bell, Terry Skinner, Gerry L. Wallace) - 3:31
 "Hey Ricky (You're a Low Down Heel)" (Melissa Manchester, Bernie Taupin) - 4:15
 "I'll Always Love You" (Tom Snow, Eric Kaz) - 3:32
 "Race to the End" (Vangelis, Jon Anderson) - 3:52
 "Wish We Were Heroes" featuring David Gates (Austin Gravelding) - 4:12
 "Come in From the Rain" (Manchester, Carole Bayer-Sager) - 4:20
 "Looking for the Perfect Ahh" (Manchester, Carole Bayer-Sager, Robbie Buchanan) - 3:15
 "Your Place or Mine" (Manchester, Allee Willis, David Paul Bryant) - 3:50
 "Someone to Watch Over Me" (George Gershwin, Ira Gershwin) - 3:52
 "Long Goodbyes" (Melissa Manchester) - 4:15 - bonus track on Japan reissue
 "My Boyfriend’s Back -Long Version" (Melissa Manchester) - 5:15 - bonus track on Japan reissue

Track-by-track personnel

"You Should Hear How She Talks About You" 
 Melissa Manchester – lead vocals
 Robbie Buchanan – synthesizers, rhythm arrangements
 Steve Lukather – guitar
 Abraham Laboriel – bass guitar
 Jeff Porcaro – drums
 Larry Williams – alto saxophone
 Will Lee, Millie Whiteside, Ula Hedwig – backing vocals

"Slowly" 
 Melissa Manchester – lead vocals, backing vocals
 Robbie Buchanan – keyboards, synthesizers
 Steve Lukather, Michael Landau – guitar
 Nathan East – bass guitar
 Jeff Porcaro – drums
 Millie Whiteside, Ula Hedwig, Will Lee – backing vocals
 Arif Mardin – rhythm arrangements
 Cengiz Yaltkaya – string arrangements, conductor

"Hey Ricky (You're a Low Down Heel)" 
 Melissa Manchester – lead vocals
 Robbie Buchanan – electric piano, synthesizers
 Larry Williams – alto saxophone, additional synthesizer
 Michael Landau – guitar
 Abraham Laboriel – bass guitar
 Jeff Porcaro – drums
 Robin Beck, Will Lee, Millie Whiteside – backing vocals

"I'll Always Love You" 
 Melissa Manchester – lead vocals
 Robbie Buchanan – electric piano, synthesizers
 Dean Parks – acoustic guitar
 Abraham Laboriel – bass guitar
 Jeff Porcaro – drums
 Tom Snow – backing vocals
 Arif Mardin – rhythm arrangements

"Race to The End" 
 Melissa Manchester – lead vocals
 Robbie Buchanan – keyboards, synthesizers
 Dean Parks – guitar
 Abraham Laboriel – bass guitar
 Jeff Porcaro – drums
 Arif Mardin – rhythm arrangements

"Wish We Were Heroes" 
 Melissa Manchester – vocals
 David Gates – vocals, acoustic guitar
 David Spinozza – acoustic guitar, electric guitar
 Hugh McCracken – acoustic guitar
 Robbie Buchanan – electric piano, synthesizers
 Don Brooks – harmonica
 Dennis Belfield – bass guitar
 Ed Greene – drums
 Arif Mardin – rhythm arrangements

"Come in from The Rain" 
 Melissa Manchester – lead vocals
 Robbie Buchanan – acoustic piano, Prophet 5 synthesizer
 Bob Christianson – additional synthesizer
 Dean Parks – guitar
 Abraham Laboriel – bass guitar
 Jeff Porcaro – drums
 Arif Mardin – arrangements

"Looking for The Perfect Ahh" 
 Melissa Manchester – lead vocals, backing vocals
 Robbie Buchanan – keyboards, synthesizers, rhythm arrangements
 Dean Parks – guitar
 Abraham Laboriel – bass guitar
Jeff Porcaro – drums
 Hamish Stuart, Lani Groves, Robin Beck, Will Lee – backing vocals

"Your Place or Mine" 
 Melissa Manchester – lead vocals 
 Robbie Buchanan – electric piano, synthesizers, rhythm arrangements
 Dean Parks – guitars
 Abraham Laboriel – bass guitar
 John Robinson – drums
 Sammy Figueroa – percussion
 Hamish Stuart – backing vocals

"Someone to Watch Over Me" 
 Melissa Manchester – lead vocals
 Stuart Elster – acoustic piano
 Jim Henken – guitar
 Cliff Hugo – bass guitar
 Sinclair Lott – drums
 David Manchester – bassoon
 Steve Cagan – conductor, rhythm arrangements, string arrangements

Production
 Producer – Arif Mardin
 Recorded by Jeremy Smith
 Additional Recording – Lew Hahn, Jay Messina and Michael O'Reilly.
 Assistant Engineers – Terry Christianson, Larold Rebhun and Gray Russell.
 Recorded at Sunset Sound,  Westlake Studios and Cherokee Studios (Hollywood, CA); Record Plant and Atlantic Studios (New York, NY).
 Remixing – Jeremy Smith, Arif Mardin and Michael O'Reilly 
 Remix Assistant – Lew Hahn
 Mastered by George Marino at Sterling Sound (New York, NY).
 Production Coordination – Chrissy Allerdings and Frank DeCaro
 Concertmasters – Gene Orloff and Jean Hugo
 Art Direction – Ria Lewerke-Shapiro
 Photography – George Hurrell

Charting History

Weekly charts

Year end charts

Charting Singles

References

1982 albums
Melissa Manchester albums
Arista Records albums
Albums produced by Arif Mardin